Courteney Lowe (born 26 March 1991) is a New Zealand professional racing cyclist.

See also
 Optum-Kelly Benefit Strategies

References

External links
 

1991 births
Living people
New Zealand female cyclists
Sportspeople from Tauranga
21st-century New Zealand women